Lourd Ernest Hanopol de Veyra (born February 11, 1975) is a Filipino musician, emcee, poet, journalist, TV host, broadcast personality and activist who became famous as the vocalist of the Manila-based jazz rock band Radioactive Sago Project.

Life and career

Education
De Veyra went to Quirino Elementary School for grade school and to Colegio de San Juan de Letran for high school. He then graduated with a Bachelor of Arts in Journalism from the University of Santo Tomas.

Early musical career
When the hardcore punk band Dead Ends ended their four-year hiatus, he became one of the band's guitarists in 1994, sharing guitar chores with the band's leader and founder Al Dimalanta, making Dead Ends a four-piece band. The band then recorded their comeback and final album, the influential Mamatay sa Ingay (1995); it had a sound different from their past materials, having more of a crossover-thrash approach. Dead Ends disbanded in 1996 (because of Jay Dimalanta's passing), after which de Veyra briefly became a member of Al Dimalanta's new band Throw (band); the band also included de Veyra's brother Francis, who played the bass. Lourd de Veyra is the nephew of singer/guitarist Mike Hanopol.

Television
De Veyra was one of the hosts of Sapul sa Singko and is in Aksyon on TV5, and in Tayuan Mo at Panindigan and Wasak on AksyonTV. He was the main host of the action documentary show Lupet until its relaunch in early 2011.

In 2013, de Veyra hosted another show for TV5 called History with Lourd.

In 2017, he hosted comedy science program You Have Been Warned Asia which broadcast across Southeast Asia on Discovery Channel.

Since 2019, Lourd hosted a late night commentary talk program "Wag Po!" aired originally on TV5 and currently aired on One PH.

Books
De Veyra has published three books of poetry: Subterranean Thought Parade, Shadowboxing in Headphones and Insectissimo.

This is a Crazy Planets is a collection of essays from his Spot.ph blog

SuperPanalo Sounds! is his first novel.

In 2014, de Veyra released a compilation of his speeches entitled Lourd de Veyra's Little Book of Speeches and a book entitled Espiritu at the 35th Manila International Book Fair.

Awards
He has thrice been a recipient of a Don Carlos Palanca Memorial Award for Literature -  A third prize in essay (English division) in 1999, a second prize in the same category in 2003, and a first prize in teleplay (Filipino division) in 2004.

Awards and nominations

See also
Radioactive Sago Project

Sources

1975 births
20th-century Filipino male singers
Filipino songwriters
Filipino television journalists
Living people
TV5 (Philippine TV network) personalities
News5 people
VJs (media personalities)
University of Santo Tomas alumni
Colegio de San Juan de Letran alumni
People from Quezon City
Musicians from Metro Manila